Enrico Luigi Micheli (16 May 1938 – 21 January 2011) was an Italian politician and writer.

Biography
After graduating in law in the University of Siena, Enrico Luigi Micheli worked as a manager for Alitalia and subsequently for the Intersind and the IRI (Institute for Industrial Reconstruction).

Micheli was elected Deputy in 1996 and 2001. As a close associate of Romano Prodi, Micheli was one of the founders of the Olive Tree. He served as Secretary of the Council of Ministers in the Prodi I Cabinet, D'Alema II Cabinet and Amato II Cabinet, while from 1998 to 1999 he served as Minister of Public Works in the D'Alema I Cabinet.

He died on 21 January 2011 at the age of 72, after a long illness.

Bibliography
Lo stato del cielo, Rai Eri (1993)  
Il ritorno di Andrea (1995) 
La gloria breve (1997)
L'uomo con il Panama, Sellerio (1998) 
Federico e i colori della giovinezza (2000) 
L'annunziata (2001) 
Le scale del Paradiso (2003)
Il palazzo del Papa (2005) 
Italo, Sellerio (2007) 
La casa sulla duna, Palomar 
Quando dalla finestra si vedeva l'Eur e noi sognavamo la rivoluzione, Sellerio (2010)

References

1938 births
2011 deaths
Italian People's Party (1994) politicians
Democracy is Freedom – The Daisy politicians
Deputies of Legislature XIII of Italy
Deputies of Legislature XIV of Italy
People from Terni
Politicians of Umbria
University of Siena alumni